The Greenhouse Gases Observing Satellite (GOSAT), also known as , is an Earth observation satellite and the world's first satellite dedicated to greenhouse gas monitoring. It measures the densities of carbon dioxide and methane from 56,000 locations on the Earth's atmosphere. The GOSAT was developed by the Japan Aerospace Exploration Agency (JAXA) and launched on 23 January 2009, from the Tanegashima Space Center. Japan's Ministry of the Environment, and the National Institute for Environmental Studies (NIES)  use the data to track gases causing the greenhouse effect, and share the data with NASA and other international scientific organizations.

Launch 
GOSAT was launched along with seven other piggyback probes using the H-IIA, Japan's primary large-scale expendable launch system, at 3:54 am on 23 January 2009 UTC on Tanegashima, a small island in southern Japan, after a two-day delay due to unfavourable weather. At approximately 16 minutes after liftoff, the separation of Ibuki from the launch rocket was confirmed.

Instruments 

According to JAXA, the Ibuki satellite is equipped with a greenhouse gas observation sensor (TANSO-FTS) and a cloud/aerosol sensor (TANSO-CAI) that supplements TANSO-FTS. The greenhouse gas observation sensor of Ibuki observes a wide range of wavelengths (near-infrared region–thermal infrared region) within the infrared band to enhance observation accuracy. The satellite uses a spectrometer to measure different elements and compounds based on their response to certain types of light. This technology allows the satellite to measure "the concentration of greenhouse gases in the atmosphere at a super-high resolution."

GOSAT-2

The Greenhouse Gases Observing Satellite-2 or GOSAT-2, also known as IBUKI-2 (COSPAR 2018-084B) was launched from Tanegashima Space Center by a H-IIA rocket on October 29, 2018.

See also 

 Orbiting Carbon Observatory 2
 Space-based Measurements of Carbon Dioxide

References

External links 
 GOSAT site by JAXA
 GOSAT site by NIES
 GOSAT-2 site by NIES

Earth observation satellites of Japan
JAXA

Spacecraft launched by H-II rockets
Spacecraft launched in 2009